Hyaloctoides semiater is a species of tephritid or fruit flies in the genus Hyaloctoides of the family Tephritidae.

Distribution
Ethiopia, Kenya, Malawi, Mozambique, Zimbabwe, South Africa.

References

Tephritinae
Insects described in 1861
Diptera of Africa